"Tú Quieres Volver" or, "You want to return" is a song by the Gipsy Kings, released on their self-titled album Gipsy Kings in 1988 (see 1988 in music).  The Gipsy Kings of 1988 are: Nicolas Reyes, Paul Reyes, Francois Reyes, Patchai Reyes, Andre Reyes, Diego Baliardo, Paco Baliardo, Tonino Baliardo, Chico Bouchikhi.

Sarah Brightman version

"Tú Quieres Volver" is a single by Sarah Brightman from her Timeless (aka Time to Say Goodbye) album, released in 1997 (see 1997 in music).

Track listing
"Tú Quieres Volver"
"O mio babbino caro"
"Heaven Is Here"

Similar songs
 The Bijelo Dugme's 1988 song "Evo zakleću se" and the Prljavo Kazalište's 1990 song "Na Badnje veče" use the same chorus melody as the song Tú Quieres Volver.

References

1988 songs
1997 singles
Gipsy Kings songs
Sarah Brightman songs
Song recordings produced by Frank Peterson